Ahmed Rhail (born 1955) is a Moroccan former cyclist. He competed in the individual road race event at the 1984 Summer Olympics.

References

External links
 

1955 births
Living people
Moroccan male cyclists
Olympic cyclists of Morocco
Cyclists at the 1984 Summer Olympics
Place of birth missing (living people)